The Top End series in 2006 was an international first-class and List A cricket series played in Darwin and Cairns in the north of Australia from 30 June to 27 July 2006.  Australia A, India A, New Zealand A and Pakistan A played as well as a Northern Territory Chief Minister's XI and a   Queensland XI team.

Venues included Marrara Oval and Gardens Oval in Darwin and Fretwell Park and Cazaly Stadium in Cairns.

External links
Fixtures and results at Cricinfo

Top End
2006–07 Australian cricket season